Maly Buzat (Kese Buźat) is a rural locality (a village) in Buzatovsky Selsoviet, Sterlibashevsky District, Bashkortostan, Russia. The population was 50 as of 2010. There are 2 streets.

Geography 
Maly Buzat is located 44 km southwest of Sterlibashevo (the district's administrative centre) by road. Kyzyl-Yar is the nearest rural locality.

References 

Rural localities in Sterlibashevsky District